John William Ogle FRCP FSA (30 July 1824, Leeds – 8 August 1905) was an English physician, honoured as the 1880 Harveian Orator.

Ogle was educated at Trinity College, Oxford with B.A. in 1847. After medical training at the medical school of St George's Hospital, he became L.R.C.P. in 1850. At Oxford he became M.A. and B.M. in 1851 and D.M. in 1857. In 1855 he was made F.R.C.P. At St George's Hospital he was curator of the museum of morbid anatomy with Henry Gray, upon whose death in 1861 he succeeded to the lecturership on pathology. Ogle became In 1857 Assistant Physician and in 1866 Full Physician. In 1869 he delivered the Croonian Lectures. At the Royal College of Physicians he was censor in the three years 1873, 1874, and 1884 and vice-president in 1886.

Ogle married in 1854 and the marriage produced five sons and one daughter. He was a devout Anglican and in the last years of his life, suffering from paralytic weakness, he lived at Highgate vicarage with one of his sons.

References

1824 births
1905 deaths
19th-century English medical doctors
Fellows of the Royal College of Physicians
Alumni of Trinity College, Oxford
People from Leeds
Medical doctors from Yorkshire